The 2015 Women's South American Volleyball Club Championship was the seventh official edition of the women's volleyball tournament, played by eight teams from 4 – 8 February 2015 in Sao Paulo, Brazil. The Brazilian club Rexona Ades claimed their second title defeating another Brazilian club, Molico/Osasco 3-1 in the final match.

Competing clubs
Teams were seeded in two pools of four according to how the representatives of their countries finished in the 2014 edition.

Preliminary round
All times are Brasília Time (UTC−03:00).

First round

Pool A

|}

|}

Pool B

|}

|}

Final round

Bracket

Final standing

All-Star team

Most Valuable Player
 Kenia Carcaces (Molico/Osasco)
Best Opposite
 Marianne Steinbrecher (Molico/Osasco)
Best Outside Hitters
 Gabriela Guimarães (Rexona Ades)
 Angela Leyva (Universidad San Martín)

Best Setter
 Dani Lins (Molico/Osasco)
Best Middle Blockers
 Ana Carolina da Silva (Rexona Ades)
 Milagros Hernández (Aragua Voleibol Club)
Best Libero
 Fabiana de Oliveira (Rexona Ades)

References

South American Volleyball Club Championship
2015 in Brazilian sport
2015
International volleyball competitions hosted by Brazil